

The 1962 Avensa Fairchild F-27 accident occurred on 25 February 1962 when a Fairchild F-27 twin-engined turboprop airliner registered YV-C-EVH of Avensa crashed into San Juan mountain on Venezuelas Margarita Island in the Caribbean Sea. All 20 passengers and three crew were killed.

Accident
The F-27 was on a scheduled flight from Porlamar Airport to Cumaná Airport, when a few minutes after departure from Portamar, the aircraft impacted San Juan Mountain and was destroyed.

Aircraft
The aircraft, a Fairchild F-27 twin-engined turboprop airliner had been built in the United States in 1958 and delivered new to Avensa on 18 September 1958.

References
Citations

Bibliography

Accidents and incidents involving the Fairchild F-27
Airliner accidents and incidents involving controlled flight into terrain
Aviation accidents and incidents in 1962
Aviation accidents and incidents in Venezuela
Avensa accidents and incidents
February 1962 events in South America
1962 disasters in Venezuela 
1962 in Venezuela